In the United States, gambling is subject to a variety of legal restrictions. In 2008, gambling activities generated gross revenues (the difference between the total amounts wagered minus the funds or "winnings" returned to the players) of $92.27 billion in the United States.

The American Gaming Association, an industry trade group, states that gaming in the U.S. is a $240 billion industry, employing 1.7 million people in 40 states. In 2016, gaming taxes contributed $8.85 billion in state and local tax revenues.

Critics of gambling argue it leads to increased political corruption, compulsive gambling, and higher crime rates. Others argue that gambling is a type of regressive tax on the individuals in local economies where gambling venues are located.

History

Authorized types
Many levels of government have authorized multiple forms of gambling in an effort to raise money for needed services without raising direct taxes. These include everything from bingo games in church basements, to multimillion-dollar poker tournaments. Sometimes states advertise revenues from certain games to be devoted to particular needs, such as education.

When New Hampshire authorized a state lottery in 1963, it represented a major shift in social policy. No state governments had previously directly run gambling operations to raise money. Other states followed suit, and now the majority of the states run some type of lottery to raise funds for state operations.  Some states restrict this revenue to specific forms of expenditures, usually oriented toward education, while others allow lottery revenues to be spent on general government.   This has brought about morally questionable issues, such as states' using marketing firms to increase their market share, or to develop new programs when old forms of gambling do not raise as much money.

The American Gaming Association breaks gambling down into the following categories:
 Card rooms, both public and private
 Commercial casinos
 Charitable games and Bingo
 Tribal casinos
 Legal bookmaking
 Lotteries
 Parimutuel wagering
 Advance-deposit wagering

Legality
While gambling is legal under U.S. federal law, there are significant restrictions pertaining to interstate and online gambling, as each state is free to regulate or prohibit the practice within its borders. 

The Professional and Amateur Sports Protection Act of 1992 effectively outlawed sports betting nationwide, excluding a few states: however, on May 14, 2018, the United States Supreme Court declared the entire law unconstitutional (Murphy v. National Collegiate Athletic Association). 

If state-run lotteries are included, then 48 states allow some form of gambling (the exceptions are Hawaii, where gambling was outlawed prior to statehood, and Utah, which has a Latter-day Saint majority population and also bans gambling in the state constitution).

However, casino-style gambling is much less widespread. Federal law provides leeway for Native American Trust Land to be used for games of chance if an agreement is put in place between the state and the tribal government (e.g. a "Compact" or "Agreement") under the Indian Gaming Regulatory Act of 1988.

As of 2020, Nevada and Louisiana are the only two states in which casino-style gambling is legal statewide, with both state and local governments imposing licensing and zoning restrictions. All other states that allow casino-style gambling restrict it to small geographic areas (e.g., Atlantic City, New Jersey or Deadwood, South Dakota), or to American Indian reservations, some of which are located in or near large cities. 

As domestic dependent nations, American Indian tribes have used legal protection to open casinos, which has been a contentious political issue in California and other states. In some states, casinos are restricted to "riverboats", large multi-story barges that are permanently moored in a body of water.

Online gambling has been more strictly regulated: the Federal Wire Act of 1961 outlawed interstate wagering on sports, but did not address other forms of gambling; it has been the subject of court cases. The Unlawful Internet Gambling Enforcement Act of 2006 (UIGEA) did not specifically prohibit online gambling; instead, it outlawed financial transactions involving online gambling service providers—some offshore gambling providers reacted by shutting down their services for US customers. 

Other operators, however, have continued to circumvent UIGEA and have continued to service US customers. For this reason, UIGEA has received criticism from notable figures within the gambling industry.

Recriminalization
On July 1, 2000, a new law took effect in the state of South Carolina, whereby the ownership, possession, or operation of a video poker machine, for either commercial or personal use, became illegal. Violators are subject to prosecution and substantial fines. Through at least 2007, the only type of legalized gambling in that state is the South Carolina Education Lottery.

Types

Commercial casinos
Commercial casinos are founded and run by private or public companies on non-Native American land. There are 24 states (and three U.S. territories) that allow commercial casinos in some form: Arkansas, Colorado, Delaware, Illinois, Indiana, Iowa, Louisiana, Maine, Maryland, Massachusetts, Michigan, Mississippi, Missouri, Montana, Nebraska, Nevada, New Jersey, New York, Northern Marianas Islands, Ohio, Pennsylvania, Puerto Rico, Rhode Island, South Dakota, U.S. Virgin Islands, Virginia, Washington, and West Virginia.

The approximately 450 commercial casinos in total produced a gross gambling revenue of $34.11 billion in 2006.

Native American gaming

The history of native American commercial gambling began in 1979, when the Seminoles began running bingo games.  Prior to this, the native Americans had no previous experience with large-scale commercial gambling. Native Americans were familiar with the concept of small-scale gambling, such as placing bets on sporting contests. For example, the Iroquois, Ojibways, and Menominees would place bets on games of snow snake. Within six years after commercial gambling among native Americans developed, seventy-five to eighty of the three hundred federally recognized tribes became involved. By 2006, about three hundred native American groups hosted some sort of gaming.

Some native American tribes operate casinos on tribal land to provide employment and revenue for their government and their tribe members. Tribal gaming is regulated on the tribal, state, and federal level. Native American tribes are required to use gambling revenue to provide for governmental operations, economic development, and the welfare of their members. Federal regulation of native American gaming was established under the Indian Gaming Regulatory Act of 1988. Under the provisions of that law, games are divided into three distinct categories:
 Class I games are "traditional" games that involve little or no wagering.
 Class II games include bingo, pull-tabs, and certain non-banked card games (poker, cribbage, contract bridge, whist, etc.).
 Class III games include all casino games (craps, roulette, blackjack, baccarat, slot machines, and other games where the player bets against the house) and games that do not properly fall into classes I or II.

Of the 562 federally recognized tribes in 1988, 201 participated in class II or class III gaming by 2001. Tribal gambling had revenues of $14.5 billion in 2002 from 354 casinos. Approximately forty percent of the 562 federally recognized tribes operate gaming establishments.

Like other Americans, many indigenous Americans have dissension over the issue of casino gambling. Some tribes are too isolated geographically to make a casino successful, while some do not want non-native Americans on their land. Though casino gambling is controversial, it has proven economically successful for most tribes, and the impact of American Indian gambling has proven to be far-reaching.

Gaming creates many jobs, not only for native Americans, but also for non-native Americans, and in this way can positively affect relations with the non-native American community. On some reservations, the number of non-native American workers is larger than the number of Native American workers because of the scale of the casino resorts. Also, some tribes contribute a share of casino revenues to the state in which they are located, or to charitable and non-profit causes. For example, the San Manuel Band of Mission Indians of California gave 4 million dollars to the UCLA Law School to establish a center for American Indian Studies. The same tribe also gave $1 million to the state for disaster relief when the area was ravaged by wildfires in 2003.

Although casinos have proven successful for both the tribes and the surrounding regions, state residents may oppose construction of native American casinos, especially if they have competing projects. For example, in November 2003, the state of Maine voted against a $650 million casino project proposed by the Penobscots and Passamaquoddies. The project's objective was to create jobs for the tribes' young people.  The same day the state voted against the Indian casino project, Maine voters approved a plan to add slot machines to the state's harness racing tracks.

The National Indian Gaming Commission oversees Native American gaming for the federal government. The National Indian Gaming Commission (NIGC) was established under the Indian Gaming Regulatory Act in 1988. Under the NIGC, Class I gaming is under the sole jurisdiction of the tribe. Class II gaming is governed by the tribe, but it is also subject to NIGC regulation. Class III gaming is under the jurisdiction of the states. For instance, in order for a tribe to build and operate a casino, the tribe must work and negotiate with the state in which it is located. These Tribal-State compacts determine how much revenue the states will obtain from the Indian casinos.

The Indian Gaming Regulatory Act requires that gaming revenues be used only for governmental or charitable purposes. The tribal governments determine specifically how gaming revenues are spent.  Revenues have been used to build houses, schools, and roads; to fund health care and education; and to support community and economic development initiatives. Indian gaming is the first and essentially the only economic development tool available on Indian reservations. The National Gaming Impact Study Commission has stated that "no...economic development other than gaming has been found". Tribal governments, though, use gaming revenues to develop other economic enterprises such as museums, malls, and cultural centers.

There are currently 30 states that have native American gaming: Alabama, Alaska, Arizona, California, Colorado, Connecticut, Florida, Idaho, Iowa, Kansas, Louisiana, Massachusetts, Michigan, Minnesota, Mississippi, Missouri, Montana, Nebraska, Nevada, New Mexico, New York, North Carolina, North Dakota, Oklahoma, Oregon, South Dakota, Texas, Washington, Wisconsin, and Wyoming.

Lotteries

The classic lottery is a drawing in which each contestant buys a combination of numbers. Each combination of numbers, or "play", is usually priced at $1. Plays are usually non-exclusive, meaning that two or more ticket holders may buy the same combination. The lottery organization then draws the winning combination of 5-8 numbers, usually from 1 to 50, using a randomized, automatic ball tumbler machine.

To win, contestants match their combinations of numbers with the drawn combination. The combination may be in any order, except in some "mega ball" lotteries, where the "mega" number for the combination must match the ball designated as the "mega ball" in the winning combination. If there are multiple winners, they split the winnings, also known as the "Jackpot". Winnings are currently subject to federal income taxes as ordinary income. Winnings can be awarded as a yearly annuity or as a lump sum, depending on lottery rules.

Most states have state-sponsored and multi-state lotteries. There are only five states that do not sell lottery tickets: Alabama, Alaska, Hawaii, Nevada, and Utah. In some states, revenues from lotteries are designated for a specific budgetary purpose, such as education. Other states put lottery revenue into the general fund.

Multi-jurisdictional lotteries generally have larger jackpots due to the greater number of tickets sold. The Mega Millions and Powerball games are the biggest of such lotteries in terms of numbers of participating states.

Scratchcard games
Some state lotteries run games other than the lotteries. Usually, these are in the scratchcard format, although some states use pull-tab games. In either format, cards are sold that have opaque areas. In some games, all of the opaque material is removed to see if the contestant has won, and how much. In other scratchcard games, a contestant must pick which parts of a card to scratch, to match amounts or play another form of game.

Sports betting

1970s–2018: Prohibition on sports betting 

In the United States, it was previously illegal under the Professional and Amateur Sports Protection Act of 1992 (PASPA) for states to authorize legal sports betting, hence making it effectively illegal. The states of Delaware, Montana, Nevada, and Oregon—which had pre-existing sports lotteries and sports betting frameworks, were grandfathered in and exempted from the effects of the Act.

A national survey in 2010 by Fairleigh Dickinson University's PublicMind found that 67% of Americans did not support the legalization of Internet betting websites in the United States, whereas 21% said they would support legalization. In a national poll released in December 2011, PublicMind asked voters whether they “support or oppose changing the federal law to allow sports betting” in their respective states. Just as many voters approved (42%) as opposed (42%) allowing sports betting. However, voters who already live in households where family members (including themselves) engage in sports betting had a strongly favored legalization of sports betting (71%–23%), while voters in households where sports betting is not an activity, opposed legalization (46%–36%). Peter J. Woolley, professor of political science and director of the poll commented on the findings, “Gambling has become, for good or ill, a national industry, and you can bet that politicians and casinos all over the country are closely following New Jersey’s plans.”

In a different study released by FDU's PublicMind in October 2011, results showed that New Jersey voters thought legalizing sports betting in New Jersey was a good idea. Half of New Jersey voters (52%) said that they approved the idea of legalizing sports betting at Atlantic City casinos and racetracks, 31% opposed it. In addition, there was a significant gender split: a majority of men approved of the idea by a wide margin (65–21), while only 39% of women approved and 41% opposed. The October results were stable, reflecting an earlier poll in April 2011 where New Jersey voters approved the legalization of sports betting in the state by a margin of 53%–30%. However, nearly two-thirds (66%) of voters were not aware of the upcoming statewide referendum on the issue. Age proved to be a divide: voters between the ages 18 and 34 were more likely to approve of sports betting than were older voters. Dr. Woolley commented: "But... younger voters... are far less likely to vote than other voters... As always, a lot depends on who actually shows up to vote."

In February 2011, FDU's PublicMind released a poll which showed that half (55%) of voters agreed "that people bet on sports games anyway, so government should allow it and tax it." On the other hand, approximately (37%) of New Jersey voters concurred that betting on sports is "a bad idea because it promotes too much gambling and can corrupt sports." Again, by a significant margin (70%–26%), voters who already engage in sports betting in office pools tend to be more supportive of legal sports betting than other voters.

Donald Hoover, a professor at the International School of Hospitality and Tourism Management at FDU and a former casino executive, commented on the results, "Betting on sports is not an uncommon practice for many New Jerseyans, but for the most part, the state doesn't supervise it, doesn't tax it and doesn't take any revenue from it." In 2010 a national poll showed that voters opposed sports betting in all states by a margin of 53–39. Woolley commented on the results, "If some states allow sports betting and profit by it, other states will want to follow." Yet by December 2011, after New Jersey passed its sports betting referendum, the national measure shifted to 42–42. In January 2012, New Jersey Governor Chris Christie signed legislation allowing sports betting in the state after it was approved in a nonbinding voter referendum in 2011. He announced on May 24, 2012 that he planned to go ahead and set up a system of wagering at the state's racetracks and casinos that fall, before the National Football League season ended.

In 2012, despite then-existing federal law prohibitions, the state legislature and Governor Chris Christie signed a law that would allow sports betting to take place at race tracks throughout the state and Atlantic City casinos. In August 2012, Fairleigh Dickinson University's PublicMind conducted a study on the issue. Voters were asked whether New Jersey should allow sports betting even if federal law prevents it from doing so, or wait to allow sports betting until federal law permits it. Results showed that nearly half (45%) of voters wanted to allow sports betting, while (38%) decided to wait and allow sports betting once Congress allows it. Krista Jenkins, director of the poll, commented, "Although support is not overwhelming, these numbers suggest the public is cautiously behind the goal of moving forward with legalized sports betting."

In November 2014, a poll found that there had been a major shift in attitudes towards sports betting in the United States, showing that 55% of Americans now favored legal sports betting, while 66% of respondents agreed that this should be regulated by state laws, as opposed to federal legislation. The poll also suggested that 33% of respondents disagreed with the notion of legalization.

In June 2017, the Supreme Court of the United States announced that it would hear New Jersey's case, Murphy v. National Collegiate Athletic Association, in the fall of 2017, contradicting the position of the US Acting Solicitor General, Jeffrey Wall, who asked that the case not be heard in May 2017. In September 2017, a poll conducted by the Washington Post and the University of Massachusetts Lowell showed a 55% majority of adults in the U.S. approved of legalizing betting on pro sporting events.

2018–present: States legalize sports betting 

In May 2018, the Supreme Court ruled in the PASPA case in favor of New Jersey, ruling that the 1992 federal ban on sports betting in most states violated their rights. After the ruling, several states, including New Jersey and Rhode Island, prepared to legalize sports betting.

On June 5, 2018, Delaware became the second state after Nevada to implement full-scale sports betting. Sports betting in the state is run by the Delaware Lottery and is available at the state's three casinos. Prior to 2018, the state offered limited sports betting consisting of parlay betting and championship futures for the NFL. Delaware had been granted a partial exemption from the sports betting ban as it had made a failed attempt at legalized sports betting in 1976.

On June 11, 2018, New Jersey became the third state to legalize sports betting. Sports betting in New Jersey began when a sportsbook opened at Monmouth Park Racetrack on June 14, 2018. Following this, sportsbooks opened at the casinos in Atlantic City and at Meadowlands Racetrack.

Several additional states followed suit in drafting bills to legalize sports betting soon after Delaware and New Jersey. Some states must still organize which department will oversee state-regulated sportsbooks, most are choosing between their respective gambling commissions or lottery boards – until then no wagers can be legally taken.

Mississippi became the fourth state in the United States to launch sports betting operations on August 1, 2018, when Gold Strike Casino Resort in Tunica Resorts and Beau Rivage in Biloxi started taking wagers. On August 30, West Virginia became the fifth state to launch sports betting, with Hollywood Casino at Charles Town Races the first casino to offer sports betting. New Mexico became the sixth state to offer sports betting on October 16, 2018, with the launch of sports betting at the Santa Ana Star Casino in Bernalillo.

Pennsylvania approved a sports betting law in October 2017, prior to PASPA being turned down. Pennsylvania became the seventh state to legalize sports betting when the state had regulations for sports betting in place in August 2018. The state approved the first sports betting licenses for Hollywood Casino at Penn National Race Course and Parx Casino on October 3, 2018. On November 17, 2018, after a two-day soft launch, Hollywood Casino became the first casino in Pennsylvania to offer sports betting. Several other casinos would follow in launching sports betting. Online sports betting in Pennsylvania began on May 28, 2019, when SugarHouse Casino launched an online sports betting app. Other casinos have followed in offering online sports betting. On November 21, 2018, Rhode Island became the eighth state to legalize sports betting, with Twin River Casino in Lincoln opening the first sportsbook in the state.

In May 2020, it was reported that since the Supreme Court's PASPA decision, over $20 billion had been spent on sports betting in the United States. As of May 2022, 30 states and Washington, D.C. have operational legalized sports betting, while an additional five states have legalized it, but have not yet launched legal sportsbooks. Wisconsin moved a step closer to having sports betting in Milwaukee in March of 2022 when Wisconsin signed a tribal compact with the Forest County Potawatomi Community.California voters were asked to decide if online sports betting would be allowed in their state with Proposition 27, on the November 2022 ballot; a majority of the revenue from online gaming operations was intended to fund relief programs for the homeless, with a smaller portion going to California's indigenous tribal communities. However, the ballot measure was defeated, with 17% of voters voting in favor.  Sports betting therefore remains illegal in the state.

Florida has seen a back and forth with sports betting starting in 2021. On May 25, 2021, Governor Ron DeSantis signed an updated gambling compact that permitted the Seminole Tribe of Florida to offer sports betting. Though the Seminole Hard Rock Sportsbook accepted bets as early as November 1, 2021, Judge Dabney L. Friedrich threw out the compact weeks later as lawsuits came forth. Briefs and answer briefs were filed throughout 2022 as Florida holds no regulated sportsbooks inside their border in 2023.

For the 2023 legislative session, Texas took gambling legislation to a new level. Before the session began, legislators filed five gambling bills. Some look to legalize sports betting as well as casino gambling while others look for harsher punishments for breaking Texas gambling laws.

Gambling revenues

According to the Center for Gaming Research University Libraries, legal gambling revenues for 2007 were as follows:
 Commercial casinos: $41.2 billion
Tribal casinos: $31.945 billion
Card rooms: $1.9 billion
 Lotteries: $80.55 billion
 Legal bookmaking: $248 million
 Pari-mutuel wagering: $295 million
 Charitable games and bingo: $2.15 billion

Grand total: $158.54 billion

See also
 Gambling
 Instant Racing
 Online gambling

References

Further reading
 Abt, Vicki, James F. Smith, and Eugene Martin Christiansen, eds. The business of risk: Commercial gambling in mainstream America (University Press of Kansas, 1985).
 Burnham, John C., ed. Bad Habits: Drinking, smoking, taking drugs, gambling, sexual misbehavior and swearing in American History (NYU Press, 1992).
 Chafetz, Henry. Play the Devil: A History of Gambling in the United States from 1492 to 1955 (1960), popular history.
 Clotfelter, Charles T., and Philip J. Cook. Selling hope: State lotteries in America (Harvard  UP, 1991).
 Ferentzy, Peter, and Nigel Turner. "Gambling and organized crime-A review of the literature." Journal of Gambling Issues 23 (2009): 111-155. Online 
 Findlay, John M.  People of Chance: Gambling in American Society from Jamestown to Las Vegas (Oxford University Press, 1986).
 Goodman, Robert. The luck business (Simon and Schuster, 1996), attacks the business
 Haller, Mark H. "The changing structure of American gambling in the twentieth century." Journal of Social Issues 35.3 (1979): 87-114.
 Lears, Jackson. Something for Nothing: Luck in America (2003). 
 Lang, Arne K. Sports betting and bookmaking: An American history (Rowman & Littlefield, 2016).
 Longstreet, Stephen. Win or Lose: A Social History of Gambling in America  (1977)
 Meyer-Arendt, Klaus, And  Rudi Hartmann, eds. ''Casino Gambling in America: Origins, Trends, and Impacts (1998) 
 O'Brien, Timothy L. Bad Bet: The Inside Story of the Glamour, Glitz, and Danger of America's Gambling Industry (1998).
 Sallaz, Jeff. The labor of luck: Casino capitalism in the United States and South Africa (U of California Press, 2009).
 Thompson, William N. Gambling in America: An encyclopedia of history, issues, and society (Abc-Clio, 2001).

External links
 American Gaming Association Gaming industry association
 National Indian Gaming Association Indian gaming industry association